Amir Pinnix (born November 30, 1985) is an American former college football running back for the Minnesota Golden Gophers. He was a prospect in the 2008 NFL Draft, but went undrafted. He played high-school football at Malcolm X Shabazz High School in Newark, New Jersey.

Early years
Amir attended Malcolm X Shabazz High School in Newark, and was an honor student and a letterman in football, basketball, and track. In football, he was a three-time All-City, All-Area, and All-Conference selection, a two-time All-County selection, and as a senior, he was also named as an All-State selection. He graduated in 2003, earning an athletic scholarship to the University of Minnesota.

College career
Amir played running back for the University of Minnesota for 4 years (2004 - 2007).  In his junior year he was the featured running back, and gained 1,272 yards with 12 touchdowns. In his college career, he gained 2,643 yard and scored 19 touchdowns. As of September 2022, he is the 10th all-time leading rusher (yards gained) in Minnesota Gopher football history.

References

1985 births
Living people
American football running backs
Malcolm X Shabazz High School alumni
Minnesota Golden Gophers football players
Players of American football from Newark, New Jersey